Associação Desportiva Penamacorense is a Portuguese sports club from Penamacor.

The men's football team had a stint on the old third tier, the Terceira Divisão, from 2006 to 2010. The team was also a Taça de Portugal regular during that time. Despite winning the I Divisão AF Castelo Branco in the 2010–11 season, no senior team was fielded after that.

References

Football clubs in Portugal
Association football clubs established in 1978
1978 establishments in Portugal
Association football clubs disestablished in 2011
2011 disestablishments in Portugal